Pierre Klossowski (9 August 1905 – 12 August 2001) was a French writer, translator and artist. He was the eldest son of the artists Erich Klossowski and Baladine Klossowska, and his younger brother was the painter Balthus.

Life
Born in Paris, Pierre Klossowski was the older brother of the artist Balthazar Klossowski, better known as Balthus. Their parents were the art historian Erich Klossowski and the painter Baladine Klossowska. His German-educated father came from a family supposedly belonging to the former Polish petty nobility (drobna szlachta) and bearing the Rola coat of arms. His mother, Baladine Klossowska, was born as Elisabeth Dorothea Spiro in Breslau, Prussia (now Wrocław, Poland). When he was 18, Pierre was André Gide's secretary and worked on the drafts of Les faux-monnayeurs for him. Klossowski was responsible for a new publication of The 120 Days of Sodom & Other Writings by the Marquis de Sade in 1964.

Writing
Klossowski wrote full length volumes on the Marquis de Sade and Friedrich Nietzsche, a number of essays on literary and philosophical figures, and five novels. Roberte Ce Soir
(Roberte in the Evening) provoked controversy due to its graphic 
depiction of sexuality. He translated several important texts (by Virgil, Ludwig Wittgenstein, Martin Heidegger, Friedrich Hölderlin, Franz Kafka, Nietzsche, and Walter Benjamin) into French, worked on films and was also an artist, illustrating many of the scenes from his novels. Klossowski participated in most issues of George Bataille's review, Acéphale, in the late 1930s.

His 1969 book, Nietzsche and the Vicious Circle, greatly influenced French philosophers such as Michel Foucault, Gilles Deleuze, and Jean-François Lyotard.

Film
Klossowski also appeared in Robert Bresson's Au hasard Balthazar as the avaricious miller who desires Marie, a character played by Anne Wiazemsky.

He was involved in:
 Raoul Ruiz's La vocation suspendue, 1977, 90';
 Raoul Ruiz's L'hypothèse du tableau volé, 1979, 66';
 Pierre Zucca's Roberte, 1979, 100';
 Alain Fleischer's Pierre Klossowski ou l'éternel détour, 1996, 106'.

His text on de Sade is mentioned in the bibliography at the beginning of Pier Paolo Pasolini's Salò, or the 120 Days of Sodom, and quoted several times through the film.

Drawing
From 20 September to 19 October 2006, there was a display of Klossowski's drawings and life size sculptures made after them with sculptor Jean-Paul Réti along with the art of Hans Bellmer at the Whitechapel Art Gallery also presented at the Ludwig Museum in Cologne and the Musée National d'Art Moderne in Paris with a film retrospective.

Bibliography

Translations
Friedrich Sieburg, Défense du nationalisme allemand, Grasset (1933)
Friedrich Sieburg, Robespierre, E. Flammarion (1936)
Ludwig Wittgenstein, Tractatus logico-philosophicus suivi de Investigations philosophiques (1961)
Martin Heidegger, Nietzsche (1971)
Friedrich Nietzsche, Le Gai Savoir
Walter Benjamin, L'œuvre d'art à l'époque de sa reproduction mécanisée  [in consultation with the author for the first publication of the essay in 1936]
J. G. Hamann, Les Méditations Bibliques, Minuit (1948). Critical edition, Éditions Ionas, 2016, read online.

See also
 College of Sociology
 French Nietzscheanism

References

Further reading
Agostini, Giulia: Der Riss im Text. Schein und Wahrheit im Werk Pierre Klossowskis, Wilhelm Fink Verlag, Munich 2012, . In German.
Arnaud, A., Pierre Klossowski (Paris: Seuil, 1990)  In French.
Decottignies, J., Klossowski notre prochain (Paris: H. Veyrier, 1985)  In French.
Decottignies, J., Pierre Klossowski. Biographie d’un monomane (Villeneuve d'Ascq: Presses Universitaires du Septentrion, 1997)  In French.
Faulkner, J., “The Vision, the Riddle, and the Vicious Circle: Pierre Klossowski Reading Nietzsche’s Sick Body through Sade’s Perversion.” Textual Practice. 21[1] (March 2007): 43–69. 
Hill, Leslie, Bataille, Klossowski, Blanchot: Writing at the Limit (Oxford: Oxford University Press, 2001)
James, Ian,  Pierre Klossowski: The Persistence of a Name (Oxford: Legenda, 2000)
James, Ian and Ford, Russell (guest editors), Diacritics, Special Issue: Whispers of the Flesh Essays in Memory of Pierre Klossowski, 35[1] (Spring 2005).
Lugan-Dardigna, A.-M., Klossowski. L’homme aux simulacres (Paris: Navarin, 1986)  In French.
Madou, J.-P., Démons et simulacres dans l’œuvre de Pierre Klossowski (Paris: Méridiens Klincksiek, 1987)  In French.
Marroni, A., Klossowski e la comunicazione artistica (Palermo: Centro Internazionale Studi di Estetica, 39, 1993)
Marroni, A., Pierre Klossowski. Sessualità, vizio e complotto nella filosofia (Milan: Costa & Nolan, 1999) 
Bennett, Jill, "Kama and Eroticism", Body. The Art Gallery of New South Wales (1997).
Marroni, A. Laws of perversion and hospitality in Pierre Klossowski, "Journal of European Psychoanalysis", 25, 2007;
Marroni, A. L'arte dei simulacri. Il dèmone estetico di Pierre Klossowski, Costa & Nolan, Milan 2009, ;
Spira, Anthony, & Sarah Wilson, Pierre Klossowski (Ostfilden: Hatje Cantz Publishers, 2006) . Exhibition Catalogue. Whitechapel Gallery London 20 September - 19 November 2006, Ludwig Museum Cologne 21 December 2006 - 18 March 2007, Musée National d'Art Moderne, Paris 2 April - 4 June 2007.
Tremblay, Thierry, Anamnèses. Essai sur l'œuvre de Pierre Klossowski (Paris: Hermann, 2012).  In French.
Ubilluz, Juan Carlos, Sacred Eroticism: Georges Bataille and Pierre Klossowski in the Latin American Erotic Novel (Bucknell University Press, 2006)

External links
Klossowski obituary from The Independent, 14 August 2001, by Ian James
Klossowski obituary from Art Forum, November 2001, by Benjamin Ivry
Reading Pierre Klossowski from Context, by John Taylor
Book review and biography, by Brett Bowles
Pierre Klossowski biography by Elena Filipovic, focussing on his drawing
Pierre Klossowski page on the-artists.org
 Journal of European Psychoanalysis

1905 births
2001 deaths
Artists from Paris
French people of Polish-Jewish descent
French biographers
20th-century French novelists
French erotica writers
Translators of Franz Kafka
French literary critics
20th-century biographers
20th-century French translators
French male essayists
French male novelists
Nietzsche scholars
20th-century French essayists
Translators of Virgil
Translators of Martin Heidegger
Translators of Friedrich Nietzsche
Male biographers